Wonder Woman 1984 (also known as WW84) is a 2020 American superhero film based on the DC character Wonder Woman. Produced by Warner Bros. Pictures, DC Films, Atlas Entertainment, and The Stone Quarry, and distributed by Warner Bros. Pictures, it is a follow-up of the 2017 film Wonder Woman and the ninth film in the DC Extended Universe (DCEU). Directed by Patty Jenkins and written by Jenkins, Geoff Johns, and Dave Callaham from a story by Johns and Jenkins, it stars Gal Gadot as Diana Prince / Wonder Woman, alongside Chris Pine, Kristen Wiig, Pedro Pascal, Robin Wright, and Connie Nielsen. Set in 1984 during the Cold War, the film follows Diana and her past love Steve Trevor as they face off against Maxwell Lord and Cheetah.

Discussion of a sequel began shortly after the release of the first film in June 2017 and the decision to proceed was confirmed the following month. Principal photography began on June 13, 2018, with filming taking place at Warner Bros. Studios, Leavesden in England, as well as the District of Columbia and Northern Virginia in the U.S., London and Duxford in England, Tenerife and Fuerteventura in the Canary Islands and Almería. Production wrapped on December 22, 2018, after a six-month shoot, with additional filming in July 2019.

Wonder Woman 1984 was originally scheduled for a wide theatrical release on June 5, 2020, but was delayed multiple times due to the COVID-19 pandemic. The film premiered on December 15, 2020, via the DC FanDome virtual platform, and was released in the United States by Warner Bros. Pictures on December 25, 2020, both theatrically and via the HBO Max streaming service. It received mixed reviews from critics. It grossed $169.6 million worldwide against a production budget of $200 million, failing to break even due to limited theaters during the COVID-19 pandemic but became the most-watched straight-to-streaming film of 2020. A spin-off prequel series focusing on the Amazons of Themyscira, Paradise Lost, is in development at DC Studios.

Plot 

As a child, Diana participates in an athletic competition on Themyscira against adult Amazons. After being knocked off her horse, she takes a shortcut and remounts, but misses a checkpoint. Antiope removes her from the race for cheating, explaining that anything worthwhile must be obtained honestly, while her mother Hippolyta advises her to be patient in her pursuit of glory and honor.

In 1984, Diana is working at the Smithsonian Institution in Washington, D.C., while secretly performing heroic deeds as Wonder Woman. New museum employee Barbara Minerva, a shy geologist and cryptozoologist, has trouble getting noticed by her co-workers, but quickly finds a friend in Diana.

The FBI asks the museum to identify stolen antiquities from a robbery that Wonder Woman recently foiled; Barbara and Diana notice a Latin inscription on one artifact (the Dreamstone) claiming to grant the holder one wish. Neither one openly takes the inscription seriously, but after Diana saves Barbara from an assailant by secretly using her powers, Barbara wishes she was strong, sexy, and cool "like" Diana and thus unintentionally acquires the same superpowers. Because Diana yearns for Steve Trevor, her lover who died heroically, he is resurrected in another man's body and the two are reunited.

Failing businessman Maxwell "Max Lord" Lorenzano steals the Dreamstone, hoping to use its power to save his nearly bankrupt oil company. His wish is to "become" the stone and gain its powers: whenever he grants someone else's desire, he can take what he wants from the wisher. This soon results in worldwide chaos, destruction, and instability.

Diana discovers that the Dreamstone was created by Dolos/Mendacius, The God of Lies, also known as the Duke of Deception. It grants a user's wish but exacts an equally strong toll unless they renounce the wish or destroy the stone. Although Diana's powers and Barbara's humanity begin to diminish, neither is willing to renounce their wish. Max visits the U.S. President, who wishes for more nuclear missiles as protection against the Soviets, but these are detected, bringing the world to the brink of nuclear war. Max also learns of a new and secret satellite system that can broadcast to anyone in the world. Since his powers are causing his body to deteriorate, he plans to grant wishes globally to steal strength and life force from the viewers and regain his health. Diana and Steve confront him, but Barbara sides with Max, overpowering Diana and escaping with him on Marine One.

Steve convinces Diana to renounce her wish and let him go, restoring her to full strength. Donning the armor of Asteria, the greatest of all Amazon warriors, Diana flies to the satellite headquarters and again battles Barbara, who has transformed into a humanoid cheetah after wishing to become an apex predator. After a brutal fight that ends in a lake, Diana overcomes Barbara with an electric shock, then pulls her out of the water. She confronts Max and uses her Lasso of Truth to communicate with the world through him, persuading everyone to renounce their wish. She then shows Max visions of his unhappy childhood and of his son, Alistair, who is frantically searching for his father amid the chaos. Realizing the error of his ways, Max renounces his wish and reunites with Alistair, simultaneously renouncing everyone else's wishes, and turning Barbara back to normal. In the present day, it is winter, and Diana meets the man whose body Steve possessed. Meanwhile, in a mid-credits scene, Asteria is revealed to be alive, living among humans and also secretly heroic.

Cast

 Gal Gadot as Diana Prince / Wonder Woman:An immortal demigoddess, Amazon princess and warrior. Diana is the daughter of Hippolyta, the Amazonian queen of Themyscira, and Zeus, the king of the Olympian Gods. Gadot spoke about the character's evolution, saying in the first film "[Diana] really is a fish out of water, coming from Themyscira into man's world and learning about the complexities of human life, really. In Wonder Woman 1984, she's been around. She's wiser and she's more mature. She's guarded and lost all of her friends throughout the years, but she's still doing the right thing, yet she is different from when we last saw her." Gadot added, "In the first movie, we really explored the journey of the coming-of-age, of how Diana Prince became Wonder Woman and owned her full strengths and powers."
 Lilly Aspell portrays a younger Diana, credited as Young Diana.
 Chris Pine as Steve Trevor:An American pilot and spy from World War I and the lost love of Diana who died in the first film. His soul possesses another man, portrayed by Kristoffer Polaha in mirror reflections; only Diana can see his face.
 Kristen Wiig as Barbara Minerva / Cheetah:A highly insecure geologist and gemologist who is befriended by Diana. She gradually transforms throughout the film by use of the Dreamstone.
 Pedro Pascal as Maxwell Lord:A struggling yet charismatic businessman, famous for TV infomercials and the founder of Black Gold Cooperative. Lord's character, according to Jenkins, is modeled on Bernie Madoff and Donald Trump. Director Patty Jenkins has stated Pascal's performance as Lord was inspired by Gordon Gekko from Oliver Stone's Wall Street and by Gene Hackman's portrayal of Lex Luthor in Richard Donner's 1978 Superman film, with Jenkins describing Lord as "a villain with potential to be dangerous and scary".
 Robin Wright as Antiope: Hippolyta's sister, general of the Amazon army and Diana's aunt.
 Connie Nielsen as Hippolyta: The queen of Themyscira and Diana's mother.

Also appearing in the film are: Amr Waked as Emir Said Bin Abydos, the ruler of the fictional oil-rich Middle Eastern nation of Bialya who Lord encounters; Kristoffer Polaha as the man whose body Steve Trevor appropriates, credited as "Handsome Man"; Natasha Rothwell as Carol, Barbara's boss at the Smithsonian; Ravi Patel as Babajide, a man who provides Diana and Barbara documents of the Dreamstone's history; Oliver Cotton as Simon Stagg, a dissatisfied investor in Lord's company; Lucian Perez as Alistair, Lord's son; Gabriella Wilde as Raquel, Lord's assistant; Kelvin Yu as Jake, Diana and Barbara's co-worker; and Stuart Milligan as the president of the United States, based off of Ronald Reagan. Doutzen Kroes reprises her DCEU role as the Amazon Venelia.

Lynda Carter, who played the titular heroine in the 1970s television series, makes a cameo appearance midway through the film credits as Asteria, a legendary Amazon warrior who anciently possessed the powerful winged suit of armor. Gadot's husband, Yaron Varsano and their two daughters, Alma and Maya, make brief appearances near the end of the film. Saïd Taghmaoui, Ewen Bremner, Eugene Brave Rock and Lucy Davis make a photographic cameo appearance, reprising their roles from Wonder Woman as Sameer, Charlie, Chief and Etta Candy, respectively. It was speculated that Alicia Vikander and Sam Worthington were going to portray Shiera Hall/Hawkgirl and Carter Hall/Hawkman.

Production

Development 
The director of the first film, Patty Jenkins, who initially signed for only one film, had expressed interest in returning to direct the sequel. In June 2017, during an interview with Variety, comic book writer Geoff Johns revealed that he and Jenkins had started writing the treatment for a Wonder Woman sequel and that he had a "cool idea for the second one". While speaking in a Q&A at a Women in Film screening of the film, Jenkins stated she would indeed direct the sequel. Jenkins later clarified that "it wasn't a confirmation. Just talking about ideas and hopes."

On July 22, 2017, at San Diego Comic-Con, the studio officially announced a sequel would be produced, with Jenkins returning as director; its title was listed as Wonder Woman 2. In September 2017, it was officially confirmed that Jenkins would be directing the sequel. On September 13, 2017, it was reported that The Expendables writer David Callaham would join the film to co-write the script with Jenkins and Johns, who had already been working on it for several months.

On February 28, 2018, it was reported that the film would be shot with IMAX film cameras in select action sequences. By late May 2018, long-time DCEU producer Zack Snyder confirmed on social media platform Vero that he, along with his wife Deborah Snyder, would serve as producers on the Wonder Woman sequel. On June 13, 2018, the title of the film was announced to be Wonder Woman 1984. A source close to Jenkins described it as a stand-alone film "in the same way that Indiana Jones or [James] Bond films are, instead of one continuous story that requires many installments."

Pre-production 
Pre-production officially began by early December 2017 in the United Kingdom. That same month, director Patty Jenkins stated that the film would be another great love story. In April 2018, the film was confirmed to be set in the 1980s. In May, production designer Aline Bonetto (Amélie, Wonder Woman) was announced to be returning for the sequel, as well as Lindy Hemming, also returning as costume designer.

Casting 
In September 2017, Gal Gadot was confirmed to return as the title character. On February 28, 2018, it was reported that Kristen Wiig was in talks with the studio to play Cheetah, the main villain of the film, with director Patty Jenkins confirming her casting the next month. By March 28, Pedro Pascal, who played Ed Indelicato in the pilot of the canceled 2011 Wonder Woman television adaptation, was cast in an undisclosed key role, later revealed to be Maxwell Lord. On June 13, Jenkins confirmed the return of Chris Pine as Steve Trevor via Twitter. On July 24, 2018, Natasha Rothwell was announced to be cast in an undisclosed role. A few days later, on July 27, Ravi Patel and Gabriella Wilde also joined the film, with their roles being kept under wraps as well. By late August, Connie Nielsen and Robin Wright were confirmed to reprise their roles as Hippolyta and Antiope in a flashback sequence. In November 2018, Kristoffer Polaha revealed that he has a role in the film.

Filming 

Principal photography began on June 13, 2018, under the working title Magic Hour. Filming took place at Warner Bros. Studios, Leavesden in England, and at a number of locations around the District of Columbia and Northern Virginia in the United States, including the Landmark Mall in Alexandria, Virginia and Georgetown during June and July 2018, with scenes shot in Alexandria from June 18 through July 14. Filming occurred outside the U.S. Capitol in Washington, D.C., during mid-June. Other filming locations around D.C. included the Penn Quarter neighborhood, McPherson Square, the DAR Constitution Hall near the White House, the Hirshhorn Museum and Sculpture Garden (Smithsonian) and the Lincoln Memorial. By July, production in the United States was completed and moved to England. In August, filming on location took place in several places around London, including St. Andrew's Place, Regent's Park and the Royal College of Physicians. Between September and October 2018, production also took place at Almería, in Andalusia, southern Spain, as well as Fuerteventura and Tenerife in the Canary Islands. From September 5 to September the 11th, filming occurred at the Alcazaba of Almería fortified complex and the Wall of Jayran in Almería. Production moved to Fuerteventura from September 13 through September 26, with the Corralejo Dunes National Park, Parque Holandés, El Jablito, La Oliva and the Jandía Natural Park as filming locations. Filming in Tenerife began during the last week of September, lasting two weeks at various different locations on the island.

Production went back to England in October, with shooting on location taking place at the Imperial War Museum in Duxford, Hyde Park and the Savoy Hotel in Central London and Torrington Square, adjacent to Birkbeck, University of London. By mid-November 2018, Pedro Pascal finished filming his scenes. Principal photography finished on December 22, 2018, after a six-month shoot. Additional photography and reshoots began on July 28, 2019, in London at Warner Bros. Studios, and was completed the following month.

It was the first film to sign-up to the Producers Guild of America guidelines on how to deal with incidents of sexual harassment on set.

Post-production 
Richard Pearson served as the editor for Wonder Woman 1984. John Moffatt (Harry Potter and Life) served as the overall visual effects supervisor for the film. Double Negative (DNEG), Framestore and Method Studios provided the visual effects for the film. Alexis Wajsbrot served as the visual effects supervisor for Framestore. In December 2019, Jenkins revealed work on the film was completed five months in advance of the original release date.

Music 

In August 2018, Hans Zimmer was announced as the composer for Wonder Woman 1984, replacing Rupert Gregson-Williams who scored the first film. Zimmer previously scored Man of Steel and Batman v Superman: Dawn of Justice, the first and second films in the DC Extended Universe and the latter which also featured Wonder Woman. The first track from the score, "Themyscira", was released as part of DC FanDome 2020. Another track, "Open Road", was released on December 10, 2020, as part of the "Week of Wonder" social media promotion leading up to the film's release.

The album was released on December 16, 2020, by WaterTower Music.

Other music featured in the film according to the closing credits include "Welcome to the Pleasuredome" by Frankie Goes to Hollywood, "Voi Che Sapete" by Wolfgang Amadeus Mozart, "Adagio in D Minor" by John Murphy, "M.E." by Gary Numan, "Rio" by Duran Duran and "I Won't Leave You" by Clinton Shorter from the 2014 film Pompeii.

The first official theatrical trailer, cut to renditions of Blue Monday by New Order and Sebastian Böhm, was well-received, but that song does not feature in the movie.

Marketing 

On June 22, 2018, it was reported that Gal Gadot would be attending the Warner Bros. DC presentation at the 2018 San Diego Comic-Con (SDCC) and some footage from the film would be shown to promote it. Director Patty Jenkins and actors Gadot and Pine attended the Wonder Woman 1984 panel at SDCC on July 21, 2018, where a short clip of the film was shown. New footage was shown during CinemaCon 2019 in Las Vegas, Nevada, with a first look at Kristen Wiig in the film. In June 2019, Warner Bros. screened an extended look to European exhibitors at CineEurope in Barcelona, Spain.

A teaser poster debuted on June 5, 2019, one year ahead of the film's then-scheduled release date. In October 2019, it was announced that the film's first trailer would debut during Comic Con Experience CCXP 2019 on December 8, with Gadot and Jenkins attending the event in São Paulo, Brazil. By the end of the month, WarnerMedia Entertainment debuted new footage from the film during the HBO Max presentation to the press. The first trailer debuted on December 8 at the 2019 Comic Con Experience (CCXP), with the show being livestreamed on Twitter around the world in real time. It used Sebastian Böhm's instrumental remix of "Blue Monday" by New Order. The same day, character posters for Wonder Woman, Maxwell Lord, Barbara Ann Minerva and Steve Trevor were released. In August 2020, the film's second trailer was released during DC FanDome.

The second trailer was "re-released" in November 2020 once the film's simultaneous theatrical and streaming debut was confirmed. Later that month, a new international poster was released, along with confirmation the film would have a presence at Brazil's Comic Con event CCXP 2020 on December 6. A one-minute final trailer was released during the convention.

Wonder Woman 1984 premiered on December 15, 2020, in a fan-first event, via the DC FanDome virtual platform. The "Virtual World Premiere" included the participation of director Jenkins, stars Gadot, Pine, Wiig and Pascal and a performance from the film's composer Zimmer. The opening scene of the film was released during the event.

The week prior to its domestic launch, the studio spent $17 million on television ads promoting the film.

Release

Theatrical and streaming 
Wonder Woman 1984 was theatrically released by Warner Bros. Pictures in a handful of international markets starting on December 16, 2020, and was theatrically released in the United States and Canada on December 25 in RealD 3D, Dolby Cinema and IMAX while streaming on HBO Max in the United States and via premium video-on-demand in Canada the same day. IMAX theaters showed a version of the film with a taller aspect ratio during select scenes. That version was also seen on HBO Max as well. The film was released theatrically in additional markets through January 28, 2021.

It was originally announced for release on December 13, 2019, before being moved up to November 1, 2019, then it was delayed to June 5, 2020. On March 24, 2020, with theatres closed for an uncertain period of time due to the COVID-19 pandemic, the film was delayed to August 14, 2020, taking the release date of Malignant. In June 2020, another delay saw the film's release pushed to October 2, 2020, before it was delayed further to the Christmas date in September, following the tepid opening weekend of Warner Bros' Tenet in the United States and in response to the continued closure of theaters in Los Angeles, San Francisco and New York City at the time.

Later, Variety reported the film would be keeping its Christmas release date in theaters, while the film would also premiere digitally on HBO Max in the United States the same day, with the film being available at no extra cost to subscribers, after a staggered theatrical release schedule in most international markets that do not have HBO Max starting on December 16, including Greece, South Africa and the United Kingdom. Shortly after, Deadline Hollywood reported that in order to get exhibitors on board with the day-and-date HBO Max release, Warner Bros. agreed to take a lower cut of the rental revenue than it usually does with a tentpole release, as well as to pull the film from HBO Max after a month so that the second month of the film's run would be exclusive to theaters. The site also said industry analysts had estimated the film's break-even point at $500million and that it was expected to lose money for the studio. Adam Aron, CEO of US theater chain AMC Theatres, supported the simultaneous release strategy, stating, "Given that atypical circumstances call for atypical economic relationships between studios and theaters and atypical windows and releasing strategies, AMC is fully onboard for Warner Brothers' announcement."

The film's simultaneous release strategy led to Warner Bros. announcing on December 3, 2020, that its entire slate of 2021 films would be given the same release strategy. This led to many filmmakers, production companies and theater chains (who were not informed and consulted with over the move) to voice their disappointment and displeasure over the move, especially in regards to the special treatment given to the cast and filmmakers of Wonder Woman 1984 that was not given to the other filmmakers and actors with their 2021 films. Despite being paid her bonus by Warner Bros. as a result of the move, Patty Jenkins herself expressed both worry and optimism over the move's impact on the future of theaters and moviegoing.

In the United Kingdom and Ireland, the film was released on premium video-on-demand services as a 48-hour rental for January 13, 2021 due to the lockdown and closure of theaters in response to COVID-19 surges. While in the Philippines, it was released on HBO Go on April 21, 2021, for the same reason.

The film was re-added to HBO Max following its premiere on HBO's linear channel on May 13, 2021.

Home media 
Wonder Woman 1984 was released as a rental on premium video-on-demand services in the United States on February 12, 2021, on Digital HD on March 16, 2021, followed by its physical release on DVD, Blu-ray and Ultra HD Blu-ray by Warner Bros. Home Entertainment on March 30. The sequences shot for IMAX presentation were retained on all home media releases. As of January 2022, Wonder Woman 1984 has sold more than 606,000 DVDs along with an estimated of 818,000 Blu-ray Discs totaling $15.9 million and $22.8 million, respectively, for a total of $38.8 million in sales revenue.

Reception

Audience viewership 
Following its opening weekend, Warner Bros. announced that HBO Max saw total viewing hours on the film's first day more than triple in comparison to a typical day in the previous month. Several days later, Screen Engine reported that 23% of viewers had subscribed to HBO Max in order to watch the film. The company also said that Wonder Woman 1984 was already the most-watched straight-to-streaming title of the year, beating Hamilton. According to Nielsen, the film totaled 2.25 billion minutes spent by HBO Max users over its first three days of release, "equivalent to about 14.9 million complete plays of the 151-minute movie". Following its opening weekend, Samba TV reported the film was streamed in 1.6 million American households over its first three days of release.

Samba TV later reported that the film was watched in 3.2 million households within its first week of release and 3.9 million in the first 17 days and in over 4.3 million U.S. households by the end of its month. Following its third weekend of release, Deadline Hollywood wrote "if there's anything positive to report, we'll hear about on the next AT&T earnings call" but if viewership numbers were noteworthy "we would have already heard about it." In January 2022, tech firm Akami reported that Wonder Woman 1984 was the eighth most pirated film of 2021.

Box office 
Wonder Woman 1984 grossed $46.8 million in the United States and Canada and $122.8 million in other territories, for a worldwide total of $169.6 million. In January 2021, The Hollywood Reporter wrote that the film would likely lose the studio "north of $100 million."

In the United States and Canada, the film was released alongside News of the World, Promising Young Woman and Pinocchio and was projected to gross around $10 million from 2,150 theaters in its opening weekend. It ended up debuting to $16.7 million, finishing above expectations and with the best total of the COVID-19 pandemic, but 87% less than the first film's opening weekend. Over 10,000 private screenings of the film were held, accounting for about $2 million (12%) of the opening weekend total. It fell 67% in its second weekend, grossing $5.5 million. In its third weekend the film fell another 45% to $3 million, with Deadline Hollywood saying it "continued to emulate the legs of a horror movie". The film grossed $2.6 million in its fourth weekend, finishing second behind newcomer The Marksman.

Internationally, the film was expected to debut to around $60 million from 32 countries. In China, the film had a disappointing first-day opening, only grossing $4.6 million, compared to the local film The Rescue, which grossed $8.9 million its first day. Global projections were subsequently lowered to $35–40 million and the film went on to debut to $38.2 million, including $5 million from IMAX screens. China was the largest opening with $18.8 million, followed by Taiwan ($3.6 million), Thailand ($2 million), Brazil ($1.7 million), Japan ($1.6 million), Mexico ($1.6 million), Singapore ($1.3 million), the United Kingdom ($1.2 million) and Spain ($1.1 million). In its second weekend of international release, the film made $19.4 million from 40 countries. Its largest markets were Australia ($4.5 million) and Japan ($2.5 million), while China's running total reached $23.9 million.

Critical response 
Slate called Wonder Woman 1984s critical response "lukewarm", and Newsweek described it as "mixed". The Washington Post reported that the response changed from "early praise to precipitous decline". According to Variety, critics praised the film's "escapist qualities" and Jenkins' take on the 1980s, but many commentators found it "overindulgent or clichéd".

The website's critical consensus reads, "Wonder Woman 1984 struggles with sequel overload, but still offers enough vibrant escapism to satisfy fans of the franchise and its classic central character." Upon the initial drop of the review embargo, the film achieved a 90% positive review score; this score gradually dropped until it ended up at 59% after the release. Audiences polled by CinemaScore gave the film an average grade of "B+" on an A+ to F scale (lower than the "A" received by its predecessor), and PostTrak reported 78% of those gave the film a positive score, with 67% saying they would definitely recommend it.

Kate Erbland of IndieWire gave the film a "B" and wrote "Wonder Woman 1984 is all about playing with magic and wishes and desires, only to see them lead to horrible ramifications, instant gratification and the revelation that lying is never without consequence. Those are some big swings and not every single one lands, but the ones that do are both joyous and genuinely worth pondering." Jake Coyle of The Associated Press considered the film "both campier and more real than Marvel movies — more like the page-turning thrill of a comic book", writing that the film has "ambitions...just outside its grasp, but it seldom feels predestined or predictable — a preciously rare commodity in the genre." Nicholas Barber of BBC gave the film four stars out of five, likening it favorably to a 1980s blockbuster and considering the plot to have a "sweet fairy-tale aspect." Richard Roeper of the Chicago Sun-Times gave the film three-and-a-half out of four stars, saying, "To be sure, we get a classic comic book movie storyline about a megalomaniacal madman intent on taking over the world, but there's often a relatively light tone to the proceedings. This is a throwback piece of pure pop entertainment."

Alonso Duralde of TheWrap wrote: "Even if the notion of wishes — making them and then takesies-backsies — isn't quite a cinematic enough concept to support Wonder Woman's final face-off with Lord, Wonder Woman 1984 still brings a freshness and a wit that's often lacking in these gargantuan costumed-hero sagas." Writing for The Guardian, Peter Bradshaw gave the film 3 out of 5 stars and stated, "Gadot is terrifically imposing, while Kristen Wiig is the scene-stealing antagonist in Patty Jenkins' epically brash sequel."

Manohla Dargis of The New York Times wrote that "Patty Jenkins is behind the camera again, but this time without the confidence. Certainly some of the problems can be pinned on the uninterestingly janky script, a mess of goofy jokes, storytelling clichés and dubious politics." Adam Graham of The Detroit News gave the film a "C" and wrote that "the result is far from wondrous, a reminder of the limitations of the superhero genre and the ways its escapist trappings sacrifice key storytelling elements (narrative, characters, dialogue) for empty spectacle." Mick LaSalle of the San Francisco Chronicle praised Gadot, writing "Her performance here has dignity and earned emotion" and calling her the best thing about the film and "She was the best thing in the first installment, too, but that was an excellent movie. This one isn't." LaSalle concludes "Often, it's a beautiful-looking film — but it's beauty without substance." In her review for RogerEbert.com, Christy Lemire wrote "The quality that made the original film such a delight has been squashed almost entirely."

Controversy
A plot point in which Steve inhabits the body of another man, credited as "Handsome Man", was criticized as Steve puts this body into dangerous situations and uses it without consent, including a scene in which it is implied that sex may have occurred between Diana and Steve. Criticism was aimed at the film's lack of acknowledgment of what happened to the man while Steve was inhabiting his body, as well as Diana and Steve not appearing to consider the issue of consent, even if Steve coming back but in another man's body was not any of the characters' intention. The Mary Sue described the event as a rape and strongly condemned it. Jenkins replied in agreement to a fan's tweet that tries to explain there were no issues with this plot aspect, that the film was following the trope of a body swap, similar to Big or Freaky Friday. Bonnie Burton, writing for CNet, stated that while this may have been Jenkins' intention, the body swap trope may not be as politically correct in the current period as it was in the 1980s.

Accolades

Future

Possible sequel
In January 2019, after principal photography on Wonder Woman 1984 was completed, director and co-writer Patty Jenkins announced that the plot for a third Wonder Woman film was mapped out. The filmmaker stated that the plot of the next installment would take place during the modern day. By December 2019, Jenkins expressed that the wait between the second and third films will be longer than the time it took to release the first sequel. In April 2020, Jenkins said she had a story arc that would take in all four Wonder Woman films, including an Amazons film and then a third Wonder Woman film. In late June 2020, speaking to Heroic Hollywood about the third film's status, Jenkins revealed that she had stopped working on the story which she had been developing six months prior so she could see how to absorb the result of the COVID-19 pandemic into the story. In an interview on the Happy Sad Confused podcast in December 2020, Jenkins stated that while she and Geoff Johns had already "beat out an entire story" for a third film, she had doubts about whether she wants to make it with the world's current state, unsure if it will be her next film and if her feelings about it will change. When interviewed by MTV News about what she would want to see in a third film, Gal Gadot stated that she wants the third film to take place in the present, having no interest on revisiting the past, as she feels that those time periods on Wonder Woman's life have been handled perfectly.

The sequel was officially greenlit on December 27, 2020, with Jenkins and Gadot officially returning and Warner Bros. confirming that the film would have a traditional theatrical release as compared to Wonder Woman 1984. In December 2022, The Hollywood Reporter reported that a third Wonder Woman film from Jenkins was not moving forward because it "did not fit in" with newly appointed DC Studios heads James Gunn and Peter Safran's plans for the DCEU. The film and other DC Studios projects in development were put into doubt as a result of the change in leadership, which Gunn claimed resulted in a transition period that created "drawbacks" and resulted in production on new films being delayed. Jenkins later stated that the film would not be moving forward under the new plans for DCEU being developed by Gunn and Safran. On January 31, 2023, Gunn and Safran stated that they had offered to let Gadot continue playing the character of Wonder Woman in the new DC Universe films.

Spin-off
In December 2019, director Patty Jenkins announced that a Wonder Woman spin-off film was in development, with the story focusing on the Amazons of Themyscira. Jenkins is attached as executive producer. By April 2020, Jenkins revealed that she will not direct the spin-off, though she will serve as producer. Later that year, the filmmaker stated that the spin-off will take place after Diana leaves Themyscira and that it will be linked to the events between Wonder Woman 1984 and the third Wonder Woman film. In January 2023, DC Studios announced Paradise Lost, a television series for HBO Max centered on the Amazons, and stated that it was in the same vein as Game of Thrones.

References

External links 

 
 
 

2020 fantasy films
2020 action adventure films
2020s fantasy action films
2020s fantasy adventure films
2020s feminist films
2020s superhero films
2020s English-language films
American action adventure films
American fantasy action films
American fantasy adventure films
American sequel films
American superhero films
Atlas Entertainment films
Cold War films
DC Extended Universe films
Films about nuclear war and weapons
Films about wish fulfillment
Films based on classical mythology
Films directed by Patty Jenkins
Films postponed due to the COVID-19 pandemic
Films produced by Zack Snyder
Films scored by Hans Zimmer
Films set in 1984
Films set in a fictional country
Films set in Cairo
Films set in China
Films set in London
Films set in Moscow
Films set in Tokyo
Films set in Fairfax County, Virginia

Films set in the White House
Films set on fictional islands
Films set in museums
Films shot at Warner Bros. Studios, Leavesden
Films shot in the Canary Islands
Films shot in Hertfordshire
Films shot in London
Films shot in Spain
Films shot in Virginia
Films about rape
Films shot in Washington, D.C.
Films with screenplays by David Callaham
Films with screenplays by Patty Jenkins
HBO Max films
IMAX films
Interquel films
Independence Day (United States) films
Obscenity controversies in film
Prequel films
Resurrection in film
The Stone Quarry films
Warner Bros. films
Wonder Woman (film series)
Wonder Woman films
2020s American films
American prequel films
Films with screenplays by Geoff Johns